Ingrannes is a commune in the Loiret department in north-central France.

Points of interest
La Cour-Dieu Abbey
Arboretum des Grandes Bruyères

In literature

Georges Simenon's 1957 novel "The Premier", focusing on the character of a retired French Prime Minister, gives the background of the protagonist's loyal driver-valet: "Emile was born at Ingrannes, in the depths of the Forest of Orleans, in a family whose men had been gamekeepers, father to son, for longer than anyone could remember. He and his brothers had been brought up together with the dogs. But he made one think of a poacher rather than a gamekeeper. After being discharged from military service he had been accepted as a driver in the Ouai d'Orsai through the influence of his local Squire. "

See also
Communes of the Loiret department

References

Communes of Loiret